The county is divided into civil  parishes.
The County of Balurga is a county (a cadastral division) in Queensland, Australia. It is located in Far North Queensland, east of Kowanyama on the Cape York Peninsula. On 7 March 1901, the Governor issued a proclamation legally dividing Queensland into counties under the Land Act 1897. Its schedule described Balurga thus:

Parishes

References

Balurga